Groß Upahler See is a lake in the Rostock district in Mecklenburg-Vorpommern, Germany. At an elevation of 40.9 m, its surface area is 1.07 km².

Lakes of Mecklenburg-Western Pomerania